Thermonema lapsum is a Gram-negative and thermophilic bacterium from the genus of Thermonema which has been isolated from a hot spring in Rotorua in New Zealand.Homospermidine and homospermine are the major polyamines of Thermonema lapsum

References

External links
Type strain of Thermonema lapsum at BacDive -  the Bacterial Diversity Metadatabase

Sphingobacteriia
Bacteria described in 1989
Thermophiles
Biota of New Zealand